Andreas Skår Bjørnstad (also written as: Andreas Skaar Bjornstad, born 14 April 1997) is a Norwegian Paralympic swimmer with cerebral palsy. He represented Norway at the 2016 Summer Paralympics in Rio de Janeiro, Brazil and he won the bronze medal in the men's 400 metres freestyle S7 event. He qualified to represent Norway at the 2020 Summer Paralympics held in Tokyo, Japan.

References

External links 
 
 

1997 births
Living people
Norwegian male breaststroke swimmers
Norwegian male freestyle swimmers
Swimmers with cerebral palsy
S7-classified Paralympic swimmers
Paralympic swimmers of Norway
Paralympic bronze medalists for Norway
Paralympic medalists in swimming
Swimmers at the 2016 Summer Paralympics
Medalists at the 2016 Summer Paralympics
Medalists at the World Para Swimming Championships
Medalists at the World Para Swimming European Championships
Place of birth missing (living people)
21st-century Norwegian people